Der Islam: Journal of the History and Culture of the Middle East is a biannual peer-reviewed academic journal covering research on the history and culture of the Middle East. The journal is published by Walter de Gruyter. It was established in 1910 by Carl Heinrich Becker and continued by Hellmut Ritter and Bertold Spuler, amongst others. The current editor-in-chief is Stefan Heidemann (University of Hamburg). The journal publishes articles in English, German, and French.

Abstracting and indexing
The journal is abstracted and indexed in:

External links
 

Biannual journals
De Gruyter academic journals
Islamic studies journals
Middle Eastern studies journals
Multilingual journals
Publications established in 1910